Mar-Zutra II was a Jewish Exilarch who led a revolt against the Sasanian rulers in 495 CE and achieved seven years of political independence in Mahoza.

Mar-Zutra II became Exilarch of the Jewish community in Babylon at the age of fifteen in 483 CE, twelve years before the revolt. After King Kavadh I denied Jews the right to organize their own militia, Mar-Zutra took advantage of the confusion into which Mazdak's communistic attempts had plunged Persia and led a successful military revolt that achieved political independence for the Jews of Mahoza.

The Jewish state lasted seven years, until 502 CE, when Kavadh finally defeated Mar-Zutra and punished him with crucifixion on the bridge of Mahoza. A son was born to him on the day of his death, who would be named Mar-Zutra III. The latter did not attain to the office of Exilarch, but returned to the Land of Israel, where he became head of the Academy of Tiberias, under the title of "Resh Pirka" ('Aρχιφεκίτησ), several generations of his descendants succeeding him in this office.

After Mar Zutra's death his successor Mar Ahunai did not dare to appear in public for almost thirty years following Mar-Zutra's defeat and it is not known whether he ever really acted as Exilarch following Kavadh's reign, which ended in 531 CE.

References

5th-century births
502 deaths
Jewish royalty
Exilarchs
People executed by crucifixion
Jewish rebels
5th-century Jews
6th-century Jews
Jews in the Sasanian Empire
People executed by the Sasanian Empire
Rebellions against the Sasanian Empire